Somersal Herbert is a hamlet and civil parish in Derbyshire, England, 2 miles northeast of Doveridge. Somersal Herbert Hall was built c.1564, incorporating an earlier building from c.1500, and is a Grade I listed building. Hill Somersal and Potter Somersal are minor settlements within 1 mile.

See also
Listed buildings in Somersal Herbert

References

Hamlets in Derbyshire
Civil parishes in Derbyshire
Derbyshire Dales